

The Spengler HS3 Skikarus is a Swiss one-man ski-glider (an early hang glider) designed and built by Hans Spengler in the 1960s. The Skikarus was a monoplane with a tail at the end of an open frame fuselage. The pilot hung from a harness at the front of the fuselage frame and wore a pair of skis for landing and takeoff. With a takeoff run downhill of between 10 and 20 metres (33 to 66 feet) it has flown distances between 200m and 1 km (655 to 32855 feet) with a maximum speed of 40 kmh (35 mph).

Specifications

See also

References

Notes

Bibliography

1960s Swiss experimental aircraft
Glider aircraft